German submarine U-762 was a Type VIIC U-boat of Nazi Germany's Kriegsmarine during World War II.

She was ordered on 9 October 1939, and was laid down on 2 January 1941, at Kriegsmarinewerft, Wilhelmshaven, as yard number 145. She was launched on 21 November 1942, and commissioned under the command of Oberleutnant zur See Wolfgang Hille on 30 January 1943.

Design
German Type VIIC submarines were preceded by the shorter Type VIIB submarines. U-762 had a displacement of  when at the surface and  while submerged. She had two shafts and two  propellers.

U-762 was fitted with five  torpedo tubes (four fitted at the bow and one at the stern), fourteen torpedoes or 26 TMA mines, one  SK C/35 naval gun, 220 rounds, and two twin  C/30 anti-aircraft guns. The boat had a complement of between 44 — 52 men.

Service history
U-762 participated in two war patrols that yielded no ships sunk or damaged.

On 8 October 1943, eleven days into U-762s first war patrol, was spotted and attacked by a British B-24 Liberator of 120 Squadron, pilotted by Bryan W. Turnbull. U-762 dove to avoid the attack, which was joined by a destroyer, and managed to escape with only two men wounded and one of her diesel engines damaged.

Oblt.z.S. Walter Pietschmann and all 50 crewmen were lost.

Wolfpacks
U-762 took part in six wolfpacks, namely:
 Rossbach (6 – 9 October 1943) 
 Schlieffen (14 – 22 October 1943) 
 Siegfried (22 – 27 October 1943) 
 Rügen 1 (6 – 7 January 1944) 
 Rügen (7 – 26 January 1944) 
 Stürmer (26 January – 3 February 1944)

References

Bibliography

External links

German Type VIIC submarines
U-boats commissioned in 1943
World War II submarines of Germany
Ships built in Wilhelmshaven
1942 ships
Maritime incidents in February 1944
World War II shipwrecks in the Atlantic Ocean
U-boats sunk by British warships
U-boats sunk by depth charges